The 8th Infantry Division (Dutch: 8de Infanterie Divisie) was an Infantry Division of the Belgian Army that fought against the German Armed forces in the Battle of Belgium.

World War II 
Source: 

As part of VII Corps, the 8th Infantry Division was part of the defense of a Meuse between Englis and the Ardennes. It also supported the strategic and fortified position of Namur.(VPN) 

At the beginning of the battle, III battalion of the 19th Line Regiment was deployed to the nearby town of Grand Bois de Grandes Salles to possibly intervene with a German Parachute landing. The 13th line regiment was sent to occupy the forest of Tronquoi to discourage and prevent a possible German landing.

When the Ardennes have been withdrawn, the 1st Company of the 2nd Battalion, and the 3rd Auxiliary regiment join the 8th Infantry Division and fortified the Meuse Meuse Sector. The 8th Infantry Division will become responsible for this sector.

After the collapse of Leige, the 8th Infantry Division's defense was heavily manned with the 2nd Division of the Ardennes Hunters, the French 1st Army, and the retreating forces of III Corps, which made the lines of position Namur extend north. The Germans didn’t hesitate to attack and are advancing on a rapid pace. The 8th Infantry Division as to get every advantage it could get to withstand this sudden collapse in resistance.

By May 15, contact was broken for a while as the high command issue that Namur and the Meuse Meuse sector be abandoned. The plan is that by May 16, the entire Corp must be west of the Scheldt Canal. But they managed to arrive at the three villages they have to defend. (Oeselhem, Markegem, and Olsene.) In an agreement with the British, VII Corps shortened their lines so the British army can take up positions south. 

But the German advance didn't halt and the 8th Infantry Division was sent to take up positions between the Leie Canal and the Upper Scheldt Canal.  The 8th Infantry Division was also responsible of securing the southern Belgian frontier in case of a British withdrawal.

The situation went downhill as the Germans advanced and encircled the allied forces in northern France and Flanders. The high command ordered that 8th Infantry Division retreat but 8th Infantry Division retained its positions. The Germans  breached the defenses but the 8th Infantry Division still managed to hold on. The division was ordered to stay intact and to the best of its abilities, retain a connecting line between them, and the 9th Infantry Division. It suffered heavy loses as Leie eventually had to be abandoned.

May 26-27 saw great chaos engulf the division as reorganization was futile. The Germans are steadily closing on the large gap created from the last retreat. The 8th Infantry Division, after a doomed attempt to join with the main army, capitulated near Kortemark.

Structure 1940 
Structure of the division at the eve of the Battle of Belgium.

 Headquarters, at Namur
 Commanding General, 8th Division -Major- General André Lesaffre
 13th Line regiment
 19th Line regiment (including III Battalion)
 21st Line regiment
 5th artillery regiment(-IV Corp)
 10th engineer battalion
 8th Battalion of Transmission troops
 Cyclist Squadron 8ID (to the 8th Infantry Division)
 Company towed C47 8ID
 (Company towed C47 on T13 ID)
 Medical Corp 8ID(to the 8th Infantry Division)

See also 
 Battle of Belgium
 Battle of Belgium Order of battle(1940)
 German Elite Airborne Troops
 French 1st Army
 9th Infantry Division 
 10th Infantry Division 
 K-W line

References

External links 
 Video of German Invasion

Battle of Belgium
Infantry divisions of Belgium in World War II